Alemagna is an Italian surname. Notable people with the surname include:

 Beatrice Alemagna (born 1973), Italian illustrator and author
 Gioacchino Alemagna (1892 -1974), Italian pastry chef and entrepreneur, founder of the Alemagna food company
 Giusto di Alemagna (15th century), a German painter active in Genoa

See also 

 Alemania

Italian-language surnames